Ian Letcher (born 21 July 1935) is  a former Australian rules footballer who played with Footscray and St Kilda in the Victorian Football League (VFL).

Notes

External links 
		

Living people
1935 births
Australian rules footballers from Victoria (Australia)
Western Bulldogs players
St Kilda Football Club players